David Joao Serralheiro Rosa (born 12 November 1986, in Fátima) is a Portuguese mountain biker. At the 2012 Summer Olympics, he competed in the men's cross-country at Hadleigh Farm, finishing in 23rd place. He was the first Portuguese ever to compete in an Olympic mountain bike competition. David Rosa is seven times MTB Portuguese National Champion.

References

Portuguese male cyclists
Cross-country mountain bikers
Living people
Olympic cyclists of Portugal
Cyclists at the 2012 Summer Olympics
Cyclists at the 2016 Summer Olympics
1986 births
Cyclists at the 2015 European Games
European Games competitors for Portugal